Dublin Christian Academy is a private Christian school located in Dublin, New Hampshire. Founded in 1964, the school serves students in kindergarten through 12th grade.

History
The school came into being through the donation of Staghead Farm by F. Nelson Blount and family to establish a Christian school. Florida pastor Melvin Moody and his brother Leon Moody were brought in as school administrators and the school opened its doors on September 8, 1964.

Extracurricular activities
Student organizations and activities include an art association, chorale, drama, and Team America Rocketry Challenge.

Athletics
Dublin Christian Academy fields teams in interscholastic competition in basketball (boys' and girls'), boys' soccer and girls' volleyball. Intramural sports available include alpine skiing and snowboarding. The Dublin boys basketball team won the state and regional championships in 2009 and 2011. The soccer team made it to eight straight state finals, winning the 2009 finals in penalty kicks. The girls' volleyball team went to the state tournament in 2010.

Notable alumni
Dana Huntley '68, editor of British Heritage magazine

Former presidents
Dr. Melvin Moody 
Dr. Leon Moody, 1995-2004
Mr. Kevin Moody, 2004-2015

References

External links
 Dublin Christian Academy

Boarding schools in New Hampshire
Christian schools in New Hampshire
Educational institutions established in 1964
Nondenominational Christian schools in the United States
Private high schools in New Hampshire
Private middle schools in New Hampshire
Private elementary schools in New Hampshire
Schools in Cheshire County, New Hampshire
1964 establishments in New Hampshire
Buildings and structures in Dublin, New Hampshire